In enzymology, a glycerol-3-phosphate cytidylyltransferase is an enzyme that catalyzes the chemical reaction

CTP + sn-glycerol 3-phosphate  diphosphate + CDP-glycerol

Thus, the two substrates of this enzyme are CTP and sn-glycerol 3-phosphate, whereas its two products are diphosphate and CDP-glycerol.

This enzyme belongs to the family of transferases, specifically those transferring phosphorus-containing nucleotide groups (nucleotidyltransferases).  The systematic name of this enzyme class is CTP:sn-glycerol-3-phosphate cytidylyltransferase. Other names in common use include CDP-glycerol pyrophosphorylase, cytidine diphosphoglycerol pyrophosphorylase, cytidine diphosphate glycerol pyrophosphorylase, CTP:glycerol 3-phosphate cytidylyltransferase, and Gro-PCT.  This enzyme participates in glycerophospholipid metabolism.

Structural studies

References 

 

EC 2.7.7
Enzymes of known structure